Jose Luis Carlos Almeida, or simply Carlos Almeida, is an Indian politician from the state of Goa. He was  a two term member of the Goa Legislative Assembly.

Political party
He is a member of the Indian National Congress.

Constituency
He had represented the Vasco Da Gama constituency from 2012 to 2021.

Health issues
On 9 March 2018, Almeida suffered a stroke while in a bathroom. He was rushed to a hospital in Dona Paula for treatment.

Posts
Chairman of Kadamba Transport Corporation Limited. He is also the Chairman of the Mormugao Planning and Development Authority (MPDA).

Committees
Sixth Legislative Assembly 2012
Chairman, Committee On Delegated Legislation
Member, Library Committee
Member, Select Committee on The Goa Commission for Minorities Bill, 2012

External links
Members of the Goa Legislative Assembly

References

Members of the Goa Legislative Assembly
Living people
Indian National Congress politicians from Goa
Bharatiya Janata Party politicians from Goa
People from South Goa district
Goa MLAs 2017–2022
Year of birth missing (living people)